Massy-Palaiseau station (French: Gare de Massy-Palaiseau) is an RER station, in the city of Massy, with a junction of the RER B (B4 section) and RER C (C2 and C8 sections). Also, Paris Metro Line 18 of Grand Paris Express will stop here in the future. It is a station in this southern outer suburb of Paris, with a connection with the TGV station, called Gare de Massy TGV.

External links

 

Railway stations in France opened in 1883
Réseau Express Régional stations
Railway stations in Essonne